Matthew Furjanic Jr. (born October 26, 1950) is an American basketball coach. He was head coach for Robert Morris University men's basketball team between 1979 and 1984, Marist College men's basketball from 1984 to 1986, the Pitt Greensburg Bobcats from 1995 to 2000 and the Polk State Eagles between 2000 and 2017. He has coached for a total of 40 years, 35 of them as head coach.

Background
Furjanic was born in Rankin, Pennsylvania. His parents were Matthew L. Furjanic Sr., and Mildred (Sedlak) Furjanic. His father was mayor of Rankin between 1954 and 1997. He attended the University of Pittsburgh before transferring to Point Park College, graduating in 1973 with a BA in Social Studies/Secondary Education. While at Pitt he played on the freshman's basketball team, and at Point Park he played on the junior varsity basketball team for one season.

Coaching career
Furjanic started his career in 1972 as an assistant basketball coach at General Braddock High School in North Braddock, Pennsylvania before becoming head coach from 1975–77. From 1977–1979 he was assistant coach at Robert Morris University in Coraopolis and took the head coaching job from 1979 until 1984. In 1984 he became the head basketball coach at Marist College in Poughkeepsie, New York for two seasons. From 1991 to 1995 he was head coach at Woodland Hills High School in Pittsburgh.

From 1995 to 2000 Furjanic was head coach at the Pitt-Greensburg. He was then named head coach at Polk State College in Winter Haven, Florida, in 2000.
While coaching the Eagles, Furjanic has an overall record of 319–214, which includes six Suncoast Conference titles (2013, 2011, 2009, 2008, 2004 and 2003), three Suncoast Conference tournament titles, and six Suncoast Conference Coach of the Year awards.

Furjanic has an overall coaching record of 606–411. His teams have won either a conference tournament or regular season championship in 20 seasons, and have reached the NCAA Division I men's basketball tournament three times (two times at Robert Morris and once at Marist).

Awards and honors
Furjanic is a five time honoree in four Halls of Fame. He was inducted into the East Boros Chapter of the Pennsylvania Hall of Fame in 1990. In November 2007, Furjanic was inducted into the Robert Morris University Hall of Fame as a coach. He was also inducted again into the Robert Morris Hall of Fame in 2014 with his 1982–83 team, the first team in RMU history to play in the NCAA Tournament. In 2013, he was inducted into the Pittsburgh Basketball Club Hall of Fame. In March 2017, he was inducted into the NJCAA Region 8-FCSAA Men’s Basketball Hall of Fame.

Coaching record

NCAA Division I

NCAA Division III

NJCAA

References

1950 births
Living people
People from Rankin, Pennsylvania
American men's basketball coaches
Basketball coaches from Pennsylvania
Basketball players from Pennsylvania
People from Allegheny County, Pennsylvania
Sportspeople from the Pittsburgh metropolitan area